Celia Deane-Drummond is Director of the Laudato Si’ Research Institute and Senior Research Fellow in theology at Campion Hall, University of Oxford. She is also honorary visiting Professor in Theology and Science at the University of Durham, UK and was Professor of Theology at the University of Notre Dame from 2011-2019. She teaches systematic theology in relation to biological science - especially evolution, ecology, genetics; bioethics - especially sustainability, ecotheology, and public theology.

She gained a BA from the University of Cambridge in Natural Sciences which became an MA in 1981, and in 1980 received her PhD in plant physiology at the University of Reading.  During the 1980s she was a lecturer in plant physiology at Durham University. Here she also took a BA in Theology, them moved to Manchester University to take a PhD in Systematic Theology.  She also has a Postgraduate Certificate in Education from Manchester Metropolitan University, was completed in 1994.

In 2000 she was appointed to a professorship in theology and the biological sciences at the University of Chester which she held until her move to the University of Notre Dame in 2011. In 2018, she founded the  Laudato Si' Research Institute at Campion Hall in Oxford, where she is the current director. She is also the editor of the international journal Philosophy, Theology and the Sciences.

Her books include: 
 Genetics and Christian Ethics (2006)
 Ecotheology (2008)
 Christ and Evolution (2009)
 Creaturely Theology: On God, Humans and Other Animals (joint ed.) (2009)
 Religion and Ecology in the Public Sphere (joint ed.) (2011)

References

External links
http://www.counterbalance.org/bio/cdrumm-frame.html
http://al.nd.edu/news/26739-notre-dame-theologian-to-lead-year-long-study-on-evolution-human-nature-2/
http://reilly.nd.edu/peopleDetail.aspx?id=2237

Systematic theologians
Alumni of the University of Cambridge
University of Notre Dame faculty
1956 births
Place of birth missing (living people)
Living people
American theologians
Ecotheology
Alumni of the University of Reading
Alumni of Durham University